YLD may refer to:
Chapleau Airport
Years lost due to disability